Major General Mahmud Khan Pulādeen (d. February 1928), also spelled as Pouladeen, was a senior military leader of the Reza Shah Pahlavi era.

In 1921, he served as personal guard to Seyyed Zia'eddin Tabatabaee. He was sent to various parts of Iran where tribal clashes were threatening stability.

After Reza Shah Pahlavi ascended to the throne, Major General Puladeen was soon arrested on charges of conspiring to overthrow Reza Shah, along with Samuel Jem, a Jewish member of parliament.

The court sentenced him to 10 years in prison, but Reza Shah insisted on his death sentence. Major General Sarteep Sheibani (a friend of Puladeen's) refused to carry out the death sentence and resigned from his post.

Finally, in 1928, he was executed in Bagh-Shah, Tehran, by firing squad. He managed to survive the firing squad's 21 bullets, but Major General Sar Lashgar Buzarjomehri went up to the wounded Puladeen and shot him in the head, finishing the execution.

References
 'Alí Rizā Awsatí (عليرضا اوسطى), Iran in the Past Three Centuries (Irān dar Se Qarn-e Goz̲ashteh - ايران در سه قرن گذشته), Volumes 1 and 2 (Paktāb Publishing - انتشارات پاکتاب, Tehran, Iran, 2003).  (Vol. 1),  (Vol. 2).

See also
Amir Abdollah Tahmasebi
Mohammad Hosein Airom
Abdolhossein Teymourtash
Sar Lashgar Buzarjomehri
Colonel Pessian
Bahram Aryana

Year of birth missing
1928 deaths
Iranian Gendarmerie personnel
People executed by Iran by firing squad
Executed Iranian people
People executed by Pahlavi Iran
1928 murders in Iraq